The United States Chess League (USCL) was the only nationwide chess league in the United States for eleven years. In 2016 the League announced it would be opened to cities from around the world, moved to the website chess.com, and renamed the Professional Rapid Online Chess League. 
 
At its peak, the USCL comprised twenty teams, whose members included some of the highest-rated chess players in the United States.  Participants in the last season included Wesley So, Alexander Onischuk, Alex Lenderman, Anton Kovalyov, Varuzhan Akobian, Daniel Naroditsky, Julio Becerra, Joel Benjamin, and many other grandmasters. The League was founded in 2005 by International Master Greg Shahade. In later seasons the league was run by Arun Sharma, who was the Vice President of the USCL.

2005
The 2005 season began on August 30 and ended on November 23 with the Baltimore Kingfishers crushing the Miami Sharks to win the inaugural USCL title.

Team Origins
The following teams were selected to play in the inaugural season.

Standings

Playoffs 
The top two teams from each division qualified for the playoffs.

All Stars

2006
The 2006 season began on August 30 and ended on November 29 as the San Francisco Mechanics defeated the New York Knights in the blitz tiebreaker to win the championship.

Expansion Teams 
On March 4, Shahade announced that two expansion teams, the Seattle Sluggers and the Tennessee Tempo, would join the league for the 2006 season making it then 10 teams. In addition, the Carolina Cobras moved to the Eastern Division in order to make space for the expansion teams.

Standings

Playoffs 
The top three teams from each division qualified for the playoffs.

*Advanced due to draw odds
**Won blitz tiebreaker

All Stars

2007
The 2007 season began on August 27 and ended on November 28 with the Dallas Destiny defeated the Boston Blitz in the blitz tiebreaker.

Expansion Teams 
Two further expansion teams, the New Jersey Knockouts and the Queens Pioneers, joined the USCL. Moreover, the Philadelphia Masterminds changed their name to the Philadelphia Inventors while the Carolina Cobras moved back to the Western Division in order to make room for the expansion teams.

Standings

Playoffs 
The top three teams from each division qualified for the playoffs.

*Won blitz tiebreaker

All Stars

2008
The 2008 season began on August 25 and ended on December 6 with a rematch of last years USCL Championship game. The Dallas Destiny successfully defended their title as they took down the Boston Blitz in another blitz tiebreaker.

Expansion Teams 
At the end of 2007, the league announced two additional teams for the 2088 season which were the Chicago Blaze and the Arizona Scorpions. Once again, the Carolina Cobras moved back to East to balance the Divisions.

Standings

Playoffs 
The top four teams from each division qualified for the playoffs.

*Won blitz tiebreaker

All Stars

2009 
The 2009 season began on August 31 and ended on December 7 with the New York Knights defeating the Miami Sharks in a blitz tiebreaker for the fourth straight season.

For the first time, the participating teams and divisions remained the same in the 2009 season with no expansion teams. One key rule change was the elimination of bonus rating points for female players, instead establishing a bonus roster spot for the team if at least one woman was on the roster.

This season would be the last season for the Tennessee Tempo as they were replaced by two expansion teams in the next season.

Standings

Playoffs 
The top four teams from each division qualified for the playoffs.

Won blitz tiebreaker

All Stars

2010
The 2010 season began on August 23 and ended on November 20 with the New England Nor'easters nearly capping off a perfect season as they crushed the Miami Sharks.

This season featured the expansion team from New England which shattered many records such as becoming the first expansion team to have a winning record and make the playoffs since the Sluggers did back in 2006, the best regular season record in 2010, and having the best record in USCL history (9.5-0.5), drawing only with their local competitors, the Boston Blitz.

The rules were also changed to eliminate alternates, favoring instead another permanent roster spot, increasing the size to nine, or ten if at least one woman is on the team.

Expansion Teams 
The league expanded from fourteen to sixteen teams this year, with the addition of three new teams which were the St. Louis Arch Bishops, the Los Angeles Vibe, and the New England Nor'easters and the folding of the Tennessee Tempo. Additionally, the Queens Pioneers moved to Manhattan and became known as the Manhattan Applesauce.

Standings

Playoffs 
The top four teams from each division qualified for the playoffs.

*Advanced due to draw odds

All Stars

2011 
The 2011 season began on August 29 and ended on November 20 with the New York Knights claiming their second title in three years title over the Chicago Blaze.

As in the 2009 season, the participating teams and divisions remained the same as in the previous season. The only major rule change was the increasing of roster size from nine spots to ten along with the elimination of the bonus roster spot that had previously been given if there was at least one woman on the team.

Standings

Playoffs 
The top four teams from each division qualified for the playoffs.

*Advanced due to draw odds

All Stars

2012

The 2012 season began on September 4 and ended on December 1 which featured the Philadelphia Inventors against the Seattle Sluggers; both making their first appearance in the title match. The Sluggers crushed the Inventors as they claimed their first title.

Expansion Team 
Despite making back-to-back playoff appearance and reaching the championship game the previous season, the Chicago Blaze did not play in 2012. Chicago's slot was filled by a new team, the Connecticut Dreadnoughts, featuring grandmaster Robert Hess as its top-rated player. This change resulted in a slight re-shuffling of the divisions, with the Carolina Cobras team moving back to the Western Division.

Standings

Playoffs 
The top four teams from each division qualified for the playoffs.

*Advanced due to draw odds

All Stars

2013

The 2013 season began on August 27 and ended on November 20 with the Miami Sharks getting their first title over the New York Knights in a rematch from 2009 championship game.

This season was the first time chess.com hosted the USCL as the Internet Chess Club parted ways with the USCL.

Due to the fact ten out of sixteen teams use eastern time and two eastern time teams are situated in the western division, the USCL decided to have four divisions instead of two to deal with the issue.

Standings

Playoffs 
The top two teams from each division qualified for the playoffs.

*Advanced due to draw odds

All Stars

2014

The 2014 season began on August 26 and ended on December 3 with the St. Louis Arch Bishops defeating the Dallas Destiny in a blitz tiebreaker.

Expansion Team 
With the addition of two new teams, the Rio Grande Ospreys and the Atlanta Kings, the league divided its eighteen teams into three divisions: Eastern, Southern, and Western.

Standings

Playoffs 
Ten total teams qualified for the playoffs. Division winners were seeded 1-3, second place teams were 4-6, third place teams were 7-9, while the wildcard team whose division scored the highest in interleague play qualified as the tenth seed.

*Won blitz tiebreaker

All Stars

2015
The 2015 season began on August 25 and ended on December 1 with the Manhattan Applesauce defeating the St. Louis Arch Bishops to claim their first title.

Expansion Teams 
With the addition of four new teams, the Las Vegas Desert Rats, Lubbock Tornadoes, Minnesota Blizzard, and San Diego Surfers, along with the departure of the Baltimore Kingfishers and the Los Angeles Vibe, the total number of teams reached 20, causing a reversion back to the two division system.

Standings

Playoffs 
The top six teams from each division qualified for the playoffs.

Eastern Division 

*Advanced due to draw odds

Western Division

All Stars

Titles by Team

Format
Teams consist of rosters of ten players, and each week the manager selects a lineup of four, depending on rating, form, and availability. The average rating for each match is capped at less than 2401, with certain exceptions for highly rated players.

The season starts the last week of August or first week of September and ends in late November or early December.  Each team plays one match per week, and matches are almost always scheduled for Tuesday and Wednesday nights.  All matches are played online at the Internet Chess Club. Team members gather at a common public location where a league-approved tournament director is present.

If either team in a given match scores two and a half points or more from the four games, that team wins the match. If the score is split at two points apiece, the match is drawn. At the end of the regular season, the four teams in each division with the highest match point totals qualify for the playoffs, which are conducted in a knockout format. In the Championship match, a drawn match proceeds to a series of blitz games to determine the ultimate winner.

References

Chess organizations
Chess in the United States
2005 establishments in the United States
Sports leagues established in 2005